A sky quality meter (SQM) is an instrument used to measure the luminance of the night sky. It is used, typically by amateur astronomers, to quantify the skyglow aspect of light pollution and uses units of "magnitudes per square arcsecond" favored by astronomers. SQM measurements can be submitted to a database on the manufacturer's website and to the citizen science project GLOBE at Night.

There are several models of SQM made, offering different fields of view (i.e. measuring different angular areas on the sky), and various automatic measurement and data logging or data communication capabilities. The current versions has only one band of observation, that can produce misinterpretations if the light pollution changes from sodium-vapor lamp to LED.

The SQM is produced by the Canadian company Unihedron in Grimsby, Ontario.

Scale 
Scientists, in the process of creating the SQM, devised a scale: between the numbers of 16.00-22.00. At the lowest number—16.00—the sky is the brightest. Customarily, this class would transpire in urbanized areas. Meanwhile, a number of 22.00 represents the least luminance—in other words, the least light pollution. Typically, this reading would materialize in rural areas.

References

External links 
 Product page on Unihedron webpage
 GLOBE at Night project
  Network of SQM measurements
Scale and Instructions on Unihedron webpage

Measuring instruments